A number of motor vessels have been named Glen Sannox, including

, a car and passenger ferry serving Clyde routes between 1957 and 1989
, a dual-fuel ferry under construction for the Arran route

Ship names